Neville Eugenton Staple (born 11 April 1955), sometimes credited as Neville Staples, is a Jamaican-born English singer, known for his work with the 2 Tone ska band the Specials, as well as with his own group, the Neville Staple Band. He also performed with Ranking Roger in the supergroup Special Beat.

Early life
Staple was born in Manchester, Jamaica. He left Jamaica to live in the English town of Rugby, Warwickshire at the age of five but later moved to Coventry. Neville was a regular fixture at the Locarno Ballroom in Coventry, where he met the resident DJ there, Pete Waterman. Waterman briefly managed the Specials and would later write the foreword to Staple's 2009 biography, Original Rude Boy.

Staple's early vocal style was mostly "toasting"—or chanting over a rhythm—a forerunner of rapping brought to Britain in the 1960s by musicians from Jamaica. Staple honed his toasting skills in the sound system scene in Coventry during the 1970s, first on his cousin's "Messenger Sound" and later his own system called "Jah Baddis".

Career

The Specials
Staple's first involvement with the Specials was when they were still called the Coventry Automatics. Initially employed as their roadie, Staple joined the band on stage at a gig supporting the Clash. At that point, the line-up already included Jerry Dammers, Horace Panter and Silverton Hutchinson on drums. Terry Hall subsequently came in as vocalist, replacing Tim Strickland, and Roddy Radiation joined on lead guitar. John Bradbury would later take over on drums from Silverton.

In the Specials, Staple sang lead vocals on some tracks or additional and backing vocals alongside Terry Hall's lead. He also contributed to the writing of many of their songs, but rarely received credit.

The Specials were managed for a time by the Clash's manager, Bernard Rhodes, whom Staple toasted in the phrase "Bernie Rhodes knows don't argue" at the beginning of the Specials' hit single "Gangsters".

Fun Boy Three
When the Specials initially split up, Staple departed with Terry Hall and Lynval Golding to form Fun Boy Three. They had a string of chart hits, some in collaboration with the all-female trio Bananarama.

Third wave of ska
In 1990, Staple joined Ranking Roger from the Beat to form Special Beat, a revival group playing hits from both former 2 Tone bands the Specials and the Beat. This was in response to the huge explosion of interest in ska in the United States—the so-called "Third Wave" of ska. Neville moved to California in the 1990s to work with many of these new American ska and punk acts, including No Doubt, Rancid and Unwritten Law. Neville also featured on the song "Explosive" by the Canadian ska band the Planet Smashers.

Staple participated in a reunion line-up of the Specials from 1993 to 2001, and again from 2009 to 2012, after which he left the band due to mostly personal reasons, as well as some health concerns.

In 2000, Staple's re-recordings of hits by the Specials and Fun Boy Three were released as The Very Best of the Specials and Fun Boy Three, without being prominently labelled as a solo work by Staple.

Solo career
Staple worked for many years in the US with various bands, including the Hitmen, the team providing the soundtrack for the 2003 movie Vampires Anonymous. Since 2004, he has toured the UK, Europe, Middle East, Australia and New Zealand with his own band, as well as several successful tours and shows alongside Ranking Roger of the Beat and Pauline Black of the Selecter, as Special Beat and Legends of Ska, respectively. He also helped to launch the career of Johnny Zee (aka Taz of Stereo Nation) of Bollywood music fame, after managing and producing him early on.

In 2004, Staple returned to the UK and formed the Neville Staple Band, releasing the critically acclaimed album The Rude Boy Returns, with contributions from Clash guitarist Mick Jones and Damned drummer Rat Scabies. The group featured former members of the British ska band Bad Manners, with Warren Middleton on trombone (later replaced by Spencer Hague), Stephen Armstrong on bass guitar, Matty Bane on drums and Andy Perriss on guitar, as well as Joe Atkinson from Flipron on keyboards/organ and occasionally Patrick Pretorius from the Talks on drums.

Biography
In April 2009, Staple set out on a reunion tour with the Specials. The same month also saw the launch of his biography, Original Rude Boy, published by Aurum Press. The book covers Staple's childhood in Jamaica and early involvement with the 1970s sound system scene, as well as his work with the Specials and Fun Boy Three. Neville collaborated with former BBC journalist Tony McMahon on the book and both are registered with the Blake Friedmann literary agency.

Later career
In December 2013, Perriss decided to leave the Neville Staple Band after more than 12 years, replaced by Billy Shinbone on guitar. However, Perriss returned to the music business in 2016 after a short break to join the Beat (featuring Ranking Roger).

In May 2014, Staple released Ska Crazy with his band, which included classic ska covers and brand new material. His wife Christine Staple and long-time friend Daddy Woody, a Jamaican DJ/artist, also provide vocals on the album.

Staple has also worked on various collaborations with the Mutants, including co-writing four tracks on the album Rhythm and Punk Review (one of them co-written with his wife Christine), as well as with the Talks Flipron, Dub Pistols and Duplex. In 2015, Staple produced his wife Christine's EP Rudegirl Sounds. Christine began performing with the Neville Staple Band that same year.

From 2016 onward, Staple has continued to collaborate with other artists, including Save Ferris, the Rifffs, Jessy Greene and Ed Rome, and has toured extensively across the UK, Europe, Australia, Hong Kong and the US. Return of Judge Roughneck & Dub Specials was released in February 2017 and was co-produced with Tom Lowry from Planet Studios and Staple's wife Christine, who also co-writes and performs songs with him. The lead track video was premiered by Vive Le Rock magazine and the album received positive reviews. Staple recreated his famous Judge Roughneck character, first heard as part of the "Stupid Marriage" song on the Specials' debut album on 2-Tone Records. The second half of the album consists of dub music.

In 2018, another joint album with Christine Sugary Staple, Rude Rebels, was released, including collaborations with former Specials bandmate Roddy "Radiation" Byers.

Neville is currently touring with his band celebrating '40 Years of Ghost Town'. The current Neville Staple Band line-up consists of Christine "Sugary" Staple on vocals, ex-Specials member Drew Stanshall on saxophone, ex-Bad Manners members Matty "Bingo" Bane on drums and Stephen "Sledge" Armstrong on bass as well as Billy Shinbone on guitar, Joe Atkinson on keyboards and Pete New on trombone.

Solo discography

Albums
 1994 – Skanktastic (Six-song EP) (Moon Records)
 2000 – Ghost Town: 13 Hits of the Specials and Fun Boy Three (Anagram – Cherry Red Records)
 2001 – Neville Staple from the Specials (525 Music Production)
 2002 – Ska Au Go-Go (as "Special Skank Ft. Neville Staple") (Cleopatra)
 2004 – The Rude Boy Returns (Rude Boy Records)
 2005 – The Rude Boy Returns: Neville Staple Live (DVD) (Asian Man Records)
 2006 - The Specials: Greatest Hits (Fantastic Price Records)
 2014 – Ska Crazy (Cleopatra)
 2017 - Return of Judge Roughneck & Dub Specials (Cleopatra)
 2018 -  Rude Rebels (as "Neville & Sugary Staple Featuring Roddy Radiation") (Cleopatra)
 2021 - From the Specials & Beyond (Cleopatra)

Compilations and guest appearances

References

External links
 Discography at Discogs.com
 
 The Specials
 Rolling Stone article on Neville and Third Wave
 Neville Staple book signing in Birmingham – May, 2009
 Neville Staple Band on Facebook
 

1955 births
Living people
20th-century English male singers
20th-century English singers
21st-century English male singers
21st-century English singers
20th-century Black British male singers
21st-century Black British male singers
English people of Jamaican descent
Black British rock musicians
The Specials members
Fun Boy Three members
Jamaican emigrants to the United Kingdom
People from Manchester Parish
British ska musicians
English autobiographers